Şahintepe can refer to:

 Şahintepe, Bismil
 Şahintepe, Kahta
 Şahintepe, Kemah